Eve's Bayou is a 1997 American Southern Gothic drama film written and directed by Kasi Lemmons, who made her directorial debut with this film. Samuel L. Jackson served as a producer, and starred in the film with Lisa Nicole Carson, Jurnee Smollett, Lynn Whitfield, Debbi Morgan, Meagan Good and Diahann Carroll. The film premiered at the 1997 Toronto International Film Festival and was released in theaters on November 7, 1997. The film grossed $14 million domestically on a budget of $4 million, making it the most commercially successful independent film of 1997.

In 2018, the film was selected by the Library of Congress for preservation in the United States National Film Registry as being "culturally, historically, or aesthetically significant". A 116-minute director's cut of the film was made a part of The Criterion Collection on October 25, 2022.

Plot
Eve Batiste, a 10-year-old girl, lives in a prosperous Creole-American community in Louisiana with her younger brother Poe and her older sister Cisely in the 1960s. Their parents are Roz and Louis, a well-respected doctor in Louisiana's African American community who claims descent from the French aristocrat who founded the town of Eve's Bayou. One night after a raucous party, Eve accidentally witnesses her father having sex with Matty Mereaux, a family friend. However, Cisely, who has a very affectionate relationship with her father, convinces Eve that she misinterpreted an innocent moment. The unreliability of memory and observation remain important themes throughout the film.

The summer quickly becomes a chaotic and stressful one for the Batiste family. Eve's relationship with her parents becomes more strained as she discovers more evidence of her father's serial infidelity. Cisely comes into conflict with both her sister and mother as she enters puberty and tries to navigate the difficult transition to adulthood, particularly with regard to her appearance and sexuality. Roz eventually begins to suspect her husband's infidelity, prompting conflict between the two as well.

Throughout the duration of the film, Eve often seeks refuge with her Aunt Mozelle, who works as a Hoodoo Practitioner with a neighborhood reputation as "The Black Widow". Eve, who also has the Spiritual gift of sight, has a premonitory dream shortly before an accident occurs, claiming Mozelle's third husband.

Mozelle's gift also brings her into direct conflict with Elzora, a fortune teller and possible witch with similar abilities. When asked for a reading by Roz, Elzora implies that an unexpected "solution" to her problem will arise, but to wait and look to her children in the meantime. When Mozelle grudgingly makes a similar request, Elzora forces her to look and address the truth she refuses to see. Meanwhile, Eve, frustrated by her father's infidelity, begins to act out, bringing her into conflict with the other members of her family. Cisely begins to behave strangely as well, isolating herself from the family after experiencing her first period.

Cisely later confides in Eve the secret behind her strange mood. She tells her that one night, after their parents had a vicious argument, Cisely went to comfort her father and he, while drunk, attempted to molest her. Enraged, Eve seeks out Elzora to commission a voodoo spell to put a fatal curse on her father. While on her way to visit the witch, Eve runs into Lenny Mereaux and questions him about his teaching job that keeps him away from home. In the conversation, she alludes to a possible tryst between his wife, Matty, and her father.

When Eve finally arrives to Elzora's home, she finds her to be not as scary as she expected but rather normal instead. While her expectation is to receive a voodoo doll of her father, she is simply told that the curse has been placed per her request. With regret, and in an attempt to save her father, Eve rushes to bring him home after finding him in a bar chatting with Matty Mereaux. At the same time, a drunken Lenny arrives to take Matty home. After a confrontation, Lenny and Matty leave the bar, and Lenny tells Louis that he will kill him if he talks to Matty again. After Louis says goodbye to Matty, Lenny shoots and kills Louis.

After her father's funeral, Eve soon finds a letter which her father wrote to Mozelle, disputing the accusations. In it, he claims that Cisely had come to him that night and kissed him, first as a daughter and then as a lover. In his drunken state, he reacted violently, slapping her and pushing her to the ground, which made her angry with him. Eve confronts Cisely and uses her second sight to discover what really happened. It ends with the sisters holding hands, gazing at the sunset.

Cast

Production

Development 
Kasi Lemmons first wrote the screenplay in 1993. Lemmons said the screenplay "originated as a series of short stories, and the children were the first layers in the short stories." Lemmons was inspired by childhood trips she took to Louisiana, saying she "wanted to write a story about people who were like royalty in a small town. Louisiana has a unique history in the U.S. It was one of the only places where slaves could buy their freedom. Even in the 1700s, there were free people of color who had citizenship because the state was owned by the French." Though the story is not autobiographical, Lemons said "there are definitely pieces of my family in it", and that the writing process was therapeutic, as it allowed her to process "things that happened to me—things that I was still wrestling with...At the core of Eve, it’s me and my childhood and wrestling with how powerful I was as a child. How did I fight my way through uncomfortable situations and the distress that I felt?”

When Lemons and producer Caldecot Chubb could not find interest from studios to finance the film or potential directors to helm the production, Lemons decided to direct it herself. After reading the script, Samuel L. Jackson came on board as both a producer and lead actor. Jackson said, "Louis Batiste was definitely someone I hadn't seen before. A family man with interesting conflicts and a romantic and glamorous life. I don't get to play those kinds of guys." In 1996, the independent company Trimark Pictures agreed to finance the film.

Casting 
Lemmons had known many of the film's principal actors from her days acting in New York theatre. Meagan Good was originally cast as 10-year-old Eve Batiste, but by the time the film's financing came together, Good had grown out of the role and was instead cast as Eve’s older sister Cisely.

Filming 
Filming took place in the fall of 1996 in Covington and Madisonville in Louisiana. The Otis House at Fairview-Riverside State Park was used as the Batiste family estate.

Reception
The film received positive reviews, with the Chicago Sun-Times Roger Ebert naming it the best film of 1997. CNN's Paul Tatara, Empire, Entertainment Weekly, the Los Angeles Times, The New York Observer, The New York Times, Time, Variety, and The Washington Post also enthusiastically praised the film and its performances.

On review aggregator Rotten Tomatoes, the film has an approval rating of 83% based on 129 reviews. The website's critical consensus reads, "Eve's Bayou marks a striking feature debut for director Kasi Lemmons, layering terrific performances and Southern mysticism into a measured meditation on disillusionment and forgiveness." 

In a 2017 retrospective essay for Vulture, Angelica Jade Bastién wrote, "The film operates deftly on multiple levels: It’s a stunning coming-of-age tale (an exceedingly rare example of one that privileges the experience of young black girls); an honest, hyperspecific portrait of black life in rural Louisiana; and one of the greatest writer-director debuts in American cinematic history."

The film received multiple accolades, including Best First Feature at the Independent Spirit Awards and Outstanding Directorial Debut for Kasi Lemmons from the National Board of Review Awards. Debbi Morgan's performance would be her most honored film role to date, with awards for Best Supporting Actress from the Chicago Film Critics Association Awards and the Independent Spirit Awards, alongside four other nominations. The film is also seen as a breakthrough for Jurnee Smollett; up to that point, she had primarily worked as a TV actress. For her performance, Smollett won a Critics' Choice Award and a San Diego Film Critics Society Award.

Impact
In February 2008, Eve's Bayou made Times list of the "25 Most Important Films on Race".

On February 22, 2009, Debbi Morgan's portrayal of Mozelle Batiste Delacroix was included in PopMatters' 100 Essential Female Film Performances list.

In 2012, Jurnee Smollett's role as Eve Batiste was included in Essence's 25 Best Roles for Black Actresses list.

Accolades
1997 Broadcast Film Critics Association Awards
 Best Child Performance – Jurnee Smollett (winner)

1997 Chicago Film Critics Association Awards
 Best Supporting Actress – Debbi Morgan (winner)

1997 National Board of Review Awards
 Outstanding Directorial Debut – Kasi Lemmons (winner)

1997 San Diego Film Critics Society Awards
 Best Supporting Actress – Jurnee Smollett (winner)

1998 Acapulco Black Film Festival
 Best Actor – Samuel L. Jackson (winner)
 Best Director – Kasi Lemmons (winner)
 Best Film (winner)
 Best Soundtrack (nominated)

1998 Independent Spirit Awards
 Best First Feature – Caldecot Chubb, Kasi Lemmons, Samuel L. Jackson (winner)
 Best Supporting Female – Debbi Morgan (winner)

1998 NAACP Image Awards
 Outstanding Lead Actor in a Motion Picture – Samuel L. Jackson (nominated)
 Outstanding Lead Actress in a Motion Picture – Lynn Whitfield (nominated)
 Outstanding Motion Picture (nominated)
 Outstanding Supporting Actor in a Motion Picture – Vondie Curtis-Hall (nominated)
 Outstanding Supporting Actress in a Motion Picture – Debbi Morgan (nominated)
 Outstanding Youth Actor/Actress – Jurnee Smollett (nominated)
 Outstanding Youth Actor/Actress – Meagan Good (nominated)

1998 Satellite Awards
 Best Performance by an Actor in a Supporting Role in a Motion Picture (Drama) – Samuel L. Jackson (nominated)
 Best Performance by an Actress in a Supporting Role in a Motion Picture (Drama) – Debbi Morgan (nominated)
 Outstanding Cinematography – Amy Vincent (nominated)

1998 Young Artist Awards
 Best Performance in a Feature Film (Leading Young Actress) – Jurnee Smollett (nominated)

1998 YoungStar Awards
 Best Performance by a Young Actress in a Drama Film – Jurnee Smollett (nominated)
 Best Performance by a Young Actress in a Drama Film – Meagan Good (nominated)

References

External links
 
 
 
 
 
 
 Eve's Bayou: The Gift of Sight an essay by Kara Keeling at The Criterion Collection

1997 films
1997 drama films
African-American drama films
Films about dysfunctional families
Films directed by Kasi Lemmons
Films set in 1962
Films set in Louisiana
Films set in the 1960s
Films shot in New Orleans
American independent films
1997 independent films
Incest in film
Southern Gothic films
Films about puberty
1990s coming-of-age drama films
Films scored by Terence Blanchard
Trimark Pictures films
United States National Film Registry films
1997 directorial debut films
African-American horror films
Films about sisters
Films about witchcraft
1990s English-language films
1990s American films
African-American films